Stickney is a village in Cook County, Illinois, United States. The village is named for Alpheus Beede Stickney, a railroad executive who played a central role in establishing the Clearing Industrial District. Per the 2020 census, the population was 7,110. It was well known in the 1920s and early 1930s as the home for several bordellos linked to mobster Al Capone's empire.

The largest wastewater treatment plant in the world, the Stickney Water Reclamation Plant (Stickney WRP), is located within the village. This facility is operated by the Metropolitan Water Reclamation District of Greater Chicago.

Geography
Stickney is located at  (41.816982, -87.786755).

Demographics
As of the 2020 census there were 7,110 people, 2,314 households, and 1,617 families residing in the village. The racial makeup of the village was 39.68% White, 2.64% African American, 3.33% Native American, 1.42% Asian, 0.04% Pacific Islander, 32.42% from other races, and 20.46% from two or more races. Hispanic or Latino of any race were 64.25% of the population.

There were 2,314 households, out of which 65.47% had children under the age of 18 living with them, 48.53% were married couples living together, 9.68% had a female householder with no husband present, and 30.12% were non-families. 27.14% of all households were made up of individuals, and 15.82% had someone living alone who was 65 years of age or older. The average household size was 3.52 and the average family size was 2.83.

The village's age distribution consisted of 26.3% under the age of 18, 4.7% from 18 to 24, 33% from 25 to 44, 22.2% from 45 to 64, and 13.7% who were 65 years of age or older. The median age was 39.0 years. For every 100 females, there were 107.2 males. For every 100 females age 18 and over, there were 122.8 males.

The median income for a household in the village was $67,246, and the median income for a family was $87,997. Males had a median income of $47,361 versus $38,373 for females. The per capita income for the village was $27,977. About 2.3% of families and 7.5% of the population were below the poverty line, including 4.5% of those under age 18 and 16.6% of those age 65 or over.

Note: the US Census treats Hispanic/Latino as an ethnic category. This table excludes Latinos from the racial categories and assigns them to a separate category. Hispanics/Latinos can be of any race.

Government
Stickney is in Illinois's 3rd congressional district.

Education
Stickney has two public elementary schools, Home School and Edison School, part of Lyons Elementary School District 103, both serving grades K-5. Students then attend George Washington Middle School in Lyons for grades 6–8.

Residents are zoned Morton West High School in Berwyn for grades 9-12 as all residents are west of Ridgeland Avenue.

The village had previously hosted Haley School which was built in 1923 and demolished in 1987; its land later being converted into Haley Park in 1989, and MacArthur School (41st and Cuyler) which was closed and later demolished. St Pius X Church had an elementary school which was closed in the 90s.

References

External links
Village of Stickney official website

Villages in Illinois
Villages in Cook County, Illinois
Chicago metropolitan area
Populated places established in 1913
1913 establishments in Illinois
Majority-minority cities and towns in Cook County, Illinois